Cryptocoryne parva is an aquatic freshwater plant, often grown in aquariums. It is the smallest known member of the genus Cryptocoryne. Native to Sri Lanka, it grows as a small rosette reaching between 5 - 8 cm. Emerse leaves are a little wider than those growing under water.
The spathe is c. 1.5 cm.

It grows very slowly even under good conditions and prefers a lot of light.

References

External links
 Crypt page

parva
Aquatic plants
Flora of Sri Lanka